The Chapala chub (Yuriria chapalae) is a cyprinid fish endemic to Mexico.

References

Yuriria (fish)
Fish described in 1899